Riyadh College of Dentistry and Pharmacy (RCDP, Arabic: كليات الرياض لطب الأسنان والصيدلة) is a private-college of dentistry and pharmacy located in Riyadh, Saudi Arabia. It is affiliated with King Saud University, one of the largest universities in the country.

RCDP offers a range of undergraduate and postgraduate programs in these fields, including Doctor of Dental Medicine (DMD), Bachelor of Pharmacy (BPharm), and Master of Science (MSc) in Dental Sciences and Pharmaceutical Sciences.

History 
RCDP was established in 2004. This was the first private educational institution in Saudi Arabia that offered post-secondary (college-level) courses. As of 2015 the rector of the college was Abdullah Al Shammery. In February 2015 he told in an interview that Saudi Arabia needed a "comprehensive cariology" in their country. The college was established in 2004.

Courses 
Currently this college offers both undergraduate and postgraduate courses. Some of the courses offered by the institutions are—
 Bachelor of Dental Surgery
 Bachelor of Dental Assisting
 Bachelor of Dental Laboratory Technology
 Bachelor of Dental Hygiene
 Bachelor of Pharmaceutical Science
 Bachelor of Medical Laboratory Technology
 Bachelor of Nursing
 Master of Science in Dentistry

References

External links 
 

2004 establishments in Saudi Arabia
Educational institutions established in 2004
Universities and colleges in Saudi Arabia